Duwakot is a settlement and former Village Development Committee—now part of Changunarayan municipality, located in Bhaktapur district of Bagmati Province in central Nepal. At the time of the 1991 Nepal census, it had a population of 5,157 with 905 houses in it.

Geography 
It is located near the Changunarayan temple, on the shore of holy river Manohara. It is surrounded by Bhaktapur Municipality in the south and Madhyapur Thimi Municipality in the west. It is about 20 km away from centre of Kathmandu. It is located on the north of the valley. About 90% of the population is educated. Most of the people are employee in government organization. Electricity facility was started from the late 1930s. 

Duwakot had 9 ward. The V.D.C. office was located at Ward No. 3. Jagaran Samuha is the oldest club of Duwakot established during early 1930s, located at the border of Ward no. 4 and 6. 

It is currently a part of Changunarayan municipality.

Education 
Nepal Engineering college,  and Kathmandu Medical College  are the major educational institutes located in Duwakot.

References

Populated places in Bhaktapur District